
Listed below are executive orders, presidential proclamations, national security decision directives and national security study directives signed by United States President Ronald Reagan. His executive actions are also listed on WikiSource.

Executive orders

1981

1982

1983

1984

1985

1986

1987

1988

1989

See also
 List of executive actions by Jimmy Carter, EO #11967–12286 (1977–1981)
 List of executive actions by George H. W. Bush, EO #12668–12833 (1989–1993)

References

External links

 
United States federal policy
Executive orders of Ronald Reagan
Ronald Reagan-related lists